Carl W. Vogt was the 15th president of Williams College from 1999 to 2000. Prior to his appointment as President of Williams College, Vogt was appointed by President Bush as the chairman of the National Transportation Safety Board in 1992. He graduated from Williams College in 1958.

References

Living people
Chairman of the National Transportation Safety Board
Williams College faculty
Williams College alumni
Presidents of Williams College
St. John's School (Texas) alumni
Year of birth missing (living people)